In mathematics, a formal series is an infinite sum that is considered independently from any notion of convergence, and can be manipulated with the usual algebraic operations on series (addition, subtraction, multiplication, division, partial sums, etc.).

Hence, power series can be viewed as a generalization of polynomials, where the number of terms is allowed to be infinite, with no requirements of convergence. Thus, the series may no longer represent a function of its variable, merely a formal sequence of coefficients, in contrast to a power series, which defines a function by taking numerical values for the variable within a radius of convergence. In combinatorics, the method of generating functions uses formal power series to represent numerical sequences and multisets, for instance allowing concise expressions for recursively defined sequences regardless of whether the recursion can be explicitly solved. More generally, formal power series can include series with any finite (or countable) number of variables, and with coefficients in an arbitrary ring.

Rings of formal power series are complete local rings, and this allows using calculus-like methods in the purely algebraic framework of algebraic geometry and commutative algebra.

Introduction
A formal power series can be loosely thought of as an object that is like a polynomial, but with infinitely many terms. Alternatively, for those familiar with power series (or Taylor series), one may think of a formal power series as a power series in which we ignore questions of convergence by not assuming that the variable X denotes any numerical value (not even an unknown value). For example, consider the series

If we studied this as a power series, its properties would include, for example, that its radius of convergence is 1. However, as a formal power series, we may ignore this completely; all that is relevant is the sequence of coefficients [1, −3, 5, −7, 9, −11, ...]. In other words, a formal power series is an object that just records a sequence of coefficients. It is perfectly acceptable to consider a formal power series with the factorials [1, 1, 2, 6, 24, 120, 720, 5040, ... ] as coefficients, even though the corresponding power series diverges for any nonzero value of X.

Arithmetic on formal power series is carried out by simply pretending that the series are polynomials. For example, if

then we add A and B term by term:

We can multiply formal power series, again just by treating them as polynomials (see in particular Cauchy product):

Notice that each coefficient in the product AB only depends on a finite number of coefficients of A and B. For example, the X5 term is given by

For this reason, one may multiply formal power series without worrying about the usual questions of absolute, conditional and uniform convergence which arise in dealing with power series in the setting of analysis.

Once we have defined multiplication for formal power series, we can define multiplicative inverses as follows. The multiplicative inverse of a formal power series A is a formal power series C such that AC = 1, provided that such a formal power series exists. It turns out that if A has a multiplicative inverse, it is unique, and we denote it by A−1. Now we can define division of formal power series by defining B/A to be the product BA−1, provided that the inverse of A exists. For example, one can use the definition of multiplication above to verify the familiar formula

An important operation on formal power series is coefficient extraction. Other examples include

Similarly, many other operations that are carried out on polynomials can be extended to the formal power series setting, as explained below.

The ring of formal power series

If one considers the set of all formal power series in X with coefficients in a commutative ring R, the elements of this set collectively constitute another ring which is written  and called the ring of formal power series in the variable X over R.

Definition of the formal power series ring
One can characterize  abstractly as the completion of the polynomial ring  equipped with a particular metric. This automatically gives  the structure of a topological ring (and even of a complete metric space). But the general construction of a completion of a metric space is more involved than what is needed here, and would make formal power series seem more complicated than they are. 
It is possible to describe  more explicitly, and define the ring structure and topological structure separately, as follows.

Ring structure

and multiplication by

This type of product is called the Cauchy product of the two sequences of coefficients, and is a sort of discrete convolution. With these operations,  becomes a commutative ring with zero element  and multiplicative identity .

The product is in fact the same one used to define the product of polynomials in one indeterminate, which suggests using a similar notation.

Given this, it is quite natural and convenient to designate a general sequence  by the formal expression , even though the latter is not an expression formed by the operations of addition and multiplication defined above (from which only finite sums can be constructed). This notational convention allows reformulation of the above definitions as

and

which is quite convenient, but one must be aware of the distinction between formal summation (a mere convention) and actual addition.

Topological structure 
Having stipulated conventionally that

one would like to interpret the right hand side as a well-defined infinite summation. There are several equivalent ways to define the desired topology.

 The desired topology could also be derived from the following metric. The distance between distinct sequences  is defined to be  where  is the smallest natural number such that ; the distance between two equal sequences is of course zero.

Informally, two sequences  and  become closer and closer if and only if more and more of their terms agree exactly. Formally, the sequence of partial sums of some infinite summation converges if for every fixed power of  the coefficient stabilizes: there is a point beyond which all further partial sums have the same coefficient. It is also obvious that the limit of the sequence of partial sums is equal to the left hand side.

This topological structure, together with the ring operations described above, form a topological ring. The topology has the useful property that an infinite summation converges if and only if the sequence of its terms converges to 0, which just means that any fixed power of  occurs in only finitely many terms.

The topological structure allows much more flexible usage of infinite summations. For instance the rule for multiplication can be restated simply as

since only finitely many terms on the right affect any fixed . Infinite products are also defined by the topological structure; it can be seen that an infinite product converges if and only if the sequence of its factors converges to 1.

Alternative topologies 
The above topology is the finest topology for which 

 

always converges as a summation to the formal power series designated by the same expression, and it often suffices to give a meaning to infinite sums and products, or other kinds of limits that one wishes to use to designate particular formal power series. It can however happen occasionally that one wishes to use a coarser topology, so that certain expressions become convergent that would otherwise diverge. This applies in particular when the base ring  already comes with a topology other than the discrete one, for instance if it is also a ring of formal power series.

In the ring of formal power series , the topology of above construction only relates to the indeterminate , since the topology that was put on  has been replaced by the discrete topology when defining the topology of the whole ring. So

converges (and its sum can be written as ); however

This way of defining the topology is in fact the standard one for repeated constructions of rings of formal power series, and gives the same topology as one would get by taking formal power series in all indeterminates at once. In the above example that would mean constructing  and here a sequence converges if and only if the coefficient of every monomial  stabilizes.

The same principle could be used to make other divergent limits converge. For instance in  the limit

does not exist, so in particular it does not converge to 

This more permissive approach is not however the standard when considering formal power series, as it would lead to convergence considerations that are as subtle as they are in analysis, while the philosophy of formal power series is on the contrary to make convergence questions as trivial as they can possibly be. With this topology it would not be the case that a summation converges if and only if its terms tend to 0.

Universal property
The ring  may be characterized by the following universal property.

  is an -algebra homomorphism

  is continuous

 .

Operations on formal power series 
One can perform algebraic operations on power series to generate new power series. Besides the ring structure operations defined above, we have the following.

Power series raised to powers
For any natural number n we have

where

(This formula can only be used if m and a0 are invertible in the ring of coefficients.)

In the case of formal power series with complex coefficients, the complex powers are well defined at least for series f with constant term equal to 1. In this case,  can be defined either by composition with the binomial series (1+x)α, or by composition with the exponential and the logarithmic series,  or as the solution of the differential equation  with constant term 1, the three definitions being equivalent. The rules of calculus  and  easily follow.

Multiplicative inverse 
The series

This condition is also sufficient; we may compute the coefficients of the inverse series  via the explicit recursive formula

An important special case is that the geometric series formula is valid in :

This means that  is a discrete valuation ring with uniformizing parameter .

Division
The computation of a quotient 

Extracting coefficients 
The coefficient extraction operator applied to a formal power series 

in X is written

and extracts the coefficient of Xm, so that

Composition 
Given formal power series

one may form the composition

where the coefficients cn are determined by "expanding out" the powers of f(X):

A more explicit description of these coefficients is provided by Faà di Bruno's formula, at least in the case where the coefficient ring is a field of characteristic 0.

Example 
If we denote by  the formal power series

then the expression

makes perfect sense as a formal power series. However, the statement

is not a valid application of the composition operation for formal power series.

Composition inverse 
Whenever a formal series 

 

has f0 = 0 and f1 being an invertible element of R, there exists a series 

 

The coefficients of  may be found recursively by using the above formula for the coefficients of a composition, equating them with those of the composition identity X (that is 1 at degree 1 and 0 at every degree greater than 1). In the case when the coefficient ring is a field of characteristic 0, the Lagrange inversion formula (discussed below) provides a powerful tool to compute the coefficients of g, as well as the coefficients of the (multiplicative) powers of g.

Formal differentiation 
Given a formal power series

we define its formal derivative, denoted Df or f ′, by

The symbol D is called the formal differentiation operator. This definition simply mimics term-by-term differentiation of a polynomial.

This operation is R-linear:

for any a, b in R and any f, g in  Additionally, the formal derivative has many of the properties of the usual derivative of calculus. For example, the product rule is valid:

and the chain rule works as well:

whenever the appropriate compositions of series are defined (see above under composition of series).

Thus, in these respects formal power series behave like Taylor series. Indeed, for the f defined above, we find that

where Dk denotes the kth formal derivative (that is, the result of formally differentiating k times).

Formal antidifferentiation 

we define its formal antiderivative or formal indefinite integral by

for any constant .

This operation is R-linear:

for any a, b in R and any f, g in  Additionally, the formal antiderivative has many of the properties of the usual antiderivative of calculus. For example, the formal antiderivative is the right inverse of the formal derivative: 

for any .

Properties

Algebraic properties of the formal power series ring 

 if  is a field, then  is a discrete valuation ring.

Topological properties of the formal power series ring 
The metric space  is complete.

The ring  is compact if and only if R is finite.

Weierstrass preparation 

The ring of formal power series with coefficients in a complete local ring satisfies the Weierstrass preparation theorem.

Applications
Formal power series can be used to solve recurrences occurring in number theory and combinatorics. For an example involving finding a closed form expression for the Fibonacci numbers, see the article on Examples of generating functions.

One can use formal power series to prove several relations familiar from analysis in a purely algebraic setting. Consider for instance the following elements of :

Then one can show that

The last one being valid in the ring 

For K a field, the ring  is often used as the "standard, most general" complete local ring over K in algebra.

Interpreting formal power series as functions

In mathematical analysis, every convergent power series defines a function with values in the real or complex numbers. Formal power series over certain special rings can also be interpreted as functions, but one has to be careful with the domain and codomain. Let 

 

Define:

Furthermore, we have

and

Unlike in the case of bona fide functions, these formulas are not definitions but have to be proved.

With this formalism, we can give an explicit formula for the multiplicative inverse of a power series  whose constant coefficient  is invertible in :

Generalizations

Formal Laurent series 
The formal Laurent series over a ring  are defined in a similar way to a formal power series, except that we also allow finitely many terms of negative degree.  That is, they are the series that can be written as

(This is different from the classical Laurent series of complex analysis.)

Multiplication of such series can be defined.

This sum has only finitely many nonzero terms because of the assumed vanishing of coefficients at sufficiently negative indices.

If  is a field, then  is in fact a field, which may alternatively be obtained as the field of fractions of the integral domain .

As with the ring  of formal power series, the ring  of formal Laurent series may be endowed with the structure of a topological ring by introducing the metric

One may define formal differentiation for formal Laurent series in the natural (term-by-term) way.

which is again a formal Laurent series. If  is a non-constant formal Laurent series and with coefficients in a field of characteristic 0, then one has

Formal residue
Assume that  is a field of characteristic 0. Then the map

is a -derivation that satisfies

The map

is -linear, and by the above observation one has an exact sequence

Some rules of calculus. As a quite direct consequence of the above definition, and of the rules of formal derivation, one has, for any 
 
 
 
  if 
 

Property (i) is part of the exact sequence above. Consequently,  and (iv) follows from (i) and (iii). Property (v) is clear from the definition.

The Lagrange inversion formula

As mentioned above, any formal series  with f0 = 0 and f1 ≠ 0 has a composition inverse  The following relation between the coefficients of gn and f−k holds (""):

In particular, for n = 1 and all k ≥ 1,

Since the proof of the Lagrange inversion formula is a very short computation, it is worth reporting it here. Noting , we can apply the rules of calculus above, crucially Rule (iv) substituting , to get:

Generalizations. One may observe that the above computation can be repeated plainly in more general settings than K((X)): a generalization of the Lagrange inversion formula is already available working in the -modules  where α is a complex exponent.

For instance, this way one finds the power series for complex powers of the Lambert function.

Power series in several variables 
Formal power series in any number of indeterminates (even infinitely many) can be defined. If I is an index set and XI is the set of indeterminates Xi for i∈I, then a monomial Xα is any finite product of elements of XI (repetitions allowed); a formal power series in XI with coefficients in a ring R is determined by any mapping from the set of monomials Xα to a corresponding coefficient cα, and is denoted . The set of all such formal power series is denoted  and it is given a ring structure by defining

and

Topology 
If I is finite, then this the J-adic topology, where J is the ideal of  generated by all the indeterminates in XI. This does not hold if I is infinite. For example, if  then the sequence  with  does not converge with respect to any J-adic topology on R, but clearly for each monomial the corresponding coefficient stabilizes.

As remarked above, the topology on a repeated formal power series ring like  is usually chosen in such a way that it becomes isomorphic as a topological ring to

Operations
All of the operations defined for series in one variable may be extended to the several variables case.

 A series is invertible if and only if its constant term is invertible in R.
 The composition f(g(X)) of two series f and g is defined if f is a series in a single indeterminate, and the constant term of g is zero. For a series f in several indeterminates a form of "composition" can similarly be defined, with as many separate series in the place of g as there are indeterminates.

In the case of the formal derivative, there are now separate partial derivative operators, which differentiate with respect to each of the indeterminates. They all commute with each other.

Universal property 
In the several variables case, the universal property characterizing  becomes the following. If S is a commutative associative algebra over R, if I is an ideal of S such that the I-adic topology on S is complete, and if x1, …, xr are elements of I, then there is a unique map  with the following properties:

 Φ is an R-algebra homomorphism
 Φ is continuous
 Φ(Xi) = xi for i = 1, …, r.

Non-commuting variables
The several variable case can be further generalised by taking non-commuting variables Xi for i ∈ I, where I is an index set and then a monomial Xα is any word in the XI; a formal power series in XI with coefficients in a ring R is determined by any mapping from the set of monomials Xα to a corresponding coefficient cα, and is denoted . The set of all such formal power series is denoted R«XI», and it is given a ring structure by defining addition pointwise

and multiplication by

where · denotes concatenation of words. These formal power series over R form the Magnus ring over R.

On a semiring 

Given an alphabet  and a semiring . It consists of all mappings , where  is the free monoid generated by the non-empty set .

The elements of  can be written as formal sums

The (Cauchy) product  is defined by

The Hadamard product  is defined by

These formal power series are used to model the behavior of weighted automata, in theoretical computer science, when the coefficients  of the series are taken to be the weight of a path with label  in the automata.

Replacing the index set by an ordered abelian group

Suppose  is an ordered abelian group, meaning an abelian group with a total ordering  respecting the group's addition, so that  if and only if  for all . Consider the set consisting of

Sometimes the notation  is used to denote .

If  is an ordered field, we can order  by setting any element to have the same sign as its leading coefficient, defined as the least element of the index set I associated to a non-zero coefficient.

This theory is due to Hans Hahn, who also showed that one obtains subfields when the number of (non-zero) terms is bounded by some fixed infinite cardinality.

Examples and related topics
 Bell series are used to study the properties of multiplicative arithmetic functions
 Formal groups are used to define an abstract group law using formal power series
 Puiseux series are an extension of formal Laurent series, allowing fractional exponents
 Rational series

See also 
 Ring of restricted power series

Notes

References 

 
 Nicolas Bourbaki: Algebra, IV, §4. Springer-Verlag 1988.

Further reading 
 W. Kuich. Semirings and formal power series: Their relevance to formal languages and automata theory. In G. Rozenberg and A. Salomaa, editors, Handbook of Formal Languages, volume 1, Chapter 9, pages 609–677. Springer, Berlin, 1997, 
 Droste, M., & Kuich, W. (2009). Semirings and Formal Power Series. Handbook of Weighted Automata, 3–28. 
 

Abstract algebra
Ring theory
Enumerative combinatorics
Mathematical series